Mahmoud Nayef Ahmad Al-Mardi is a Jordanian footballer who plays as a midfielder for Kuwait Premier League club Qadsia and the Jordan national team.

Club career

Kedah Darul Aman
On 19 June 2022, Mahmoud Al Mardi signed for Malaysia Super League club Kedah Darul Aman. He scored on his debut against Kaya FC and he scored hattrick against Visakha FC in AFC Cup knockout stage.

Career statistics

Club

International career 
Mardi's first match with the Jordan national senior team was against Kyrgyzstan on 15 September 2015 in the 2018 FIFA World Cup qualification, which resulted in a 0–0 draw.

International career statistics

International goals

With U-23

With senior team
Scores and results list Jordan's goal tally first.

Honours
Al-Muharraq
 AFC Cup: 2021
 Bahraini FA Cup: 2021

Al-Faisaly
 Jordanian Pro League: 2018–19
 Jordan FA Cup: 2018–19
 Jordan Super Cup: 2020

References

External links 

Mahmoud Al-Mardi at jo.gitsport.net

Al-Arabi SC (Kuwait) players
Living people
Jordan international footballers
Footballers at the 2014 Asian Games
1993 births
Jordanian footballers
Association football forwards
Al-Ahli SC (Amman) players
Al-Wehdat SC players
Al-Faisaly SC players
Al-Muharraq SC players
Al-Jazeera (Jordan) players
Ittihad Al-Ramtha players
Ittihad Al-Zarqa players
Al-Sheikh Hussein FC players
Asian Games competitors for Jordan
Expatriate footballers in Kuwait
Expatriate footballers in Bahrain
Jordanian expatriate footballers
Kuwait Premier League players
Jordanian expatriate sportspeople in Kuwait
AFC Cup winning players
Bahraini Premier League players
Jordanian Pro League players
Jordanian expatriate sportspeople in Bahrain